Stadionul Municipal is a multi-use stadium in Râmnicu Sărat, Romania. It is the home ground of CSM Râmnicu Sărat and holds 6,500 people.

References

Football venues in Romania
Buildings and structures in Buzău County